65803 Didymos (provisional designation ) is a sub-kilometer asteroid and binary system that is classified as a potentially hazardous asteroid and near-Earth object of the Apollo group. The asteroid was discovered in 1996 by the Spacewatch survey at Kitt Peak, and its small 160-meter minor-planet moon, named Dimorphos, was discovered in 2003. Due to its binary nature, the asteroid was then named Didymos, the Greek word for 'twin'.

Didymos's moon, Dimorphos, was the target of the DART mission to test the viability of asteroid impact avoidance by collision with a spacecraft, while the impact was witnessed by LICIACube, a flyby CubeSat component of the mission.

Discovery 

Didymos was discovered on 11 April 1996 by the University of Arizona Steward Observatory's, and Lunar and Planetary Laboratory's, Spacewatch survey using its 0.9-meter telescope at Kitt Peak National Observatory in Arizona, United States. The binary nature of the asteroid was discovered by others; suspicions of binarity first arose in Goldstone delay-Doppler echoes, and these were confirmed with an optical lightcurve analysis, along with Arecibo radar imaging on 23 November 2003.

Orbital characteristics 
Didymos orbits the Sun at a distance of 1.0–2.3 AU once every 770 days (2 years and 1 month). Its orbit has an eccentricity of 0.38 and an inclination of 3° with respect to the ecliptic. The minimum distance between the orbit of Earth and the orbit of Didymos is currently , but will change as the asteroid is perturbed. In November 2003 it passed 7.18 million km from Earth; it will not come that near again until November 2123, with a distance of 5.86 million km. Didymos also occasionally passes very close to Mars: it will fly by Mars at a distance of 4.68 million km in July 2144. Even the Earth approach of October 2184 is still listed with an uncertainty region of roughly ±.

Physical characteristics 

In the SMASS classification, Didymos was classified as an Xk-type asteroid, which transitions from the X-type to the rare K-type asteroids. Subsequent visible and near-infrared spectroscopy showed it to be silicate in nature, which also qualifies it as a stony S-type asteroid. It rotates rapidly, with a period of 2.26 hours and a low brightness variation of 0.08 magnitude, which indicates that the body has a nearly spheroidal shape. Radar observations confirmed this spheroidal shape, showing it to be oblate due to its rapid rotation.

Satellite 

Didymos is a binary asteroid with a satellite in its orbit. The minor-planet moon, named Dimorphos, moves in a mostly circular retrograde orbit with an orbital period of 11.9 hours. It was previously known by its provisional designation  and had been informally called "Didymoon" or "Didymos B".

Naming 
This minor planet was named "Didymos", Greek for "twin", due to its binary nature. The name was suggested by the discoverer, University of Arizona Lunar and Planetary Laboratory astronomer Joseph L. "Joe" Montani, who made the naming proposal to the International Astronomical Union after the binary nature of the object was detected. The approved naming citation was published on 13 July 2004.

The proper name for the satellite Didymos B comes from the word "Dimorphos", Greek for "having two forms". The meaning of the name represents how the form of Dimorphos's orbit will change after the collision with NASA’s Double Asteroid Redirection Test (DART) spacecraft, though in fact the change will be only a very slight change in its orbital parameters. Appropriately, Dimorphos serves dual roles as both a test target and as a part of a blueprint for a modality for future planetary protection. The name of the moon was suggested by planetary scientist Kleomenis Tsiganis at the Aristotle University of Thessaloniki, Greece.

Exploration 

In the early 2010s, Didymos moon, Dimorphos was to be the principal target of proposed robotic mission by the ESA and NASA, called the Asteroid Impact & Deflection Assessment (AIDA) mission. The ESA dropped out, and the mission did not proceed. 

NASA redefined mission requirements and decided to proceed with a 2020s mission to visit Didymos with an impactor, which had been considered as a part of the earlier AIDA mission, named the Double Asteroid Redirection Test or DART. The NASA mission was intended to test whether a spacecraft impact could successfully deflect an asteroid on a collision course with Earth. The DART spacecraft was launched on 24 November 2021, and impacted Dimorphos on September 26, 2022. It was accompanied by the Italian Space Agency's (ASI) six-unit LICIACube flyby Cubesat that was released 15 days before impact to observe the asteroid and DART's impact. 

DART was the first spacecraft to intentionally target and successfully visit an asteroid known to have a minor-planet moon (The binary asteroid  was targeted by the PROCYON mission before it failed, 243 Ida was visited by the Galileo spacecraft but its moon was unknown until then, Pluto was considered a planet until a few months after the launch of New Horizons, and 3548 Eurybates's and 15094 Polymele's moons were not discovered until months before and after Lucy's launch, respectively).

After two weeks of analysis, NASA announced that the collision shortened Dimorphos's orbital period around Didymos by 32 minutes, far more than the minimum requirement of 73 seconds and the success benchmark of 10 minutes. The measurement has an uncertainty of ±2 minutes.

Another mission to Didymos was approved in November 2019 for a planned launch in 2024, to arrive at Didymos in January 2027.  ESA's Hera mission is planning to survey the dynamical effects of the DART impact and measure the characteristics of the crater made by DART.

See also 
 66391 Moshup – a similar near-Earth asteroid binary system
 List of asteroids visited by spacecraft

Notes

References

External links 
 Asteroids with Satellites, Robert Johnston, johnstonsarchive.net
 Dictionary of Minor Planet Names, Google books
 Discovery Circumstances: Numbered Minor Planets (65001)-(70000) – Minor Planet Center
 
 

Apollo asteroids
Discoveries by the Spacewatch project
Didymos
Binary asteroids
Radar-imaged asteroids
Minor planets visited by spacecraft
Objects observed by stellar occultation
Potentially hazardous asteroids
19960411